Casual employment or contract employment is an employment classification under employment law.

Australia
In Australian workplace law whereby an employee is paid at a higher hourly rate (usually 25%) in lieu of having their employment guaranteed, and lacking other usual full-time employment conditions such as sick leave. 28% of all Australian workers were employed on a casual basis in 2003.

Employers often contact casual employees regularly from week to week to supplement their normal workforce as needed. As there is no expectation in a casual work contract between employee and employer of ongoing work, employees can legally refuse any specific work opportunity. The government defines Casual employees as those from whom regular work is not expected, they are not bounded by any legal body and can at their convenience switch places they work at.

Under various workplace awards, employment classification can change if a certain number of hours is worked in a particular time frame.

New Zealand
In New Zealand, casual employees are guaranteed either annual leave pro-rata, or 8% holiday pay on top of earnings. Casual employment contracts lack sick leave and guaranteed work hours.

In Jinkinson v Oceana Gold (NZ) Ltd, the Employment Court of New Zealand ruled that:

The distinction between casual employment and ongoing employment lies in the extent to which the parties have mutual employment related obligations between periods of work. If those obligations only exist during periods of work, the employment will be regarded as casual. If there are mutual obligations which continue between periods of work, there will be an ongoing employment relationship"

Under Lee v Minor Developments Ltd t/a Before Six Childcare Centre (2008), the Employment Court outlined the following characteristics as those the courts use to assess whether employment is casual:

Engagement for short periods of time for specific purposes;
A lack of regular work pattern or expectation of ongoing employment;
Employment is dependent on the availability of work demands;
No guarantee of work from one week to the next;
Employment as and when needed;
The lack of an obligation on the employer to offer employment, or on the employee to accept any other engagement; and
Employees are only engaged for the specific term of each period of employment.

In 2008, the Fourth Labour Government proposed the strengthening of casual employment rights. However, they were voted out of office later during the year.

United Kingdom
The UK Government defines casual employment as the following:
Employees occasionally do work for a specific business
The business does not have to offer employees work and employees do not have to accept it – employees only work when they want to
The contract with the business uses terms like 'casual', 'freelance', 'zero hours', 'as required' or something similar
Employees had to agree with the business's terms and conditions to get work – either verbally or in writing
Employees are under the supervision or control of a manager or director
Employees cannot send someone else to do their work
The business deducts tax and National Insurance contributions from their wages
The business provides materials, tools or equipment they need to do the work

See also 
Australian Fair Pay and Conditions Standard
Contingent work
Employment
Informal sector
Zero-hour contract

References 

Employment classifications
Employment in Australia